Executions at Fremantle Prison in Fremantle, Western Australia, were carried out between 1889 and 1964. Other places of execution in Western Australia included the Roundhouse at Fremantle;  the old and new Perth Gaols; on the island of Rottnest; at the sites of the capital offence, such as at Maddington and Norrilong, York; on the eastern end of The Causeway at Victoria Park; at Redcliffe; at Roebourne in the Pilbara; at Derby and Mount Dockerell (near Halls Creek) in the Kimberley; and at Albany and Geraldton. All executions were by hanging except that of Midgegooroo, carried out by firing squad at the old Perth Gaol in 1833.
 
43 men and one woman were hanged at Fremantle Prison. Condemned prisoners were vigilantly observed to prevent suicide attempts. On the day of execution, they were hanged by falling through an opening trap door with a noose around their neck, in front of witnesses. In the 19th century, the media gave comprehensive accounts of the executions, but in later years they became private matters, concealed within the prison walls. Capital punishment was abolished in Western Australia in 1984.

Included on the list below are all the executions carried out at Fremantle Prison.

History 
Western Australia's first legal execution of a British colonist occurred in 1844, outside the Roundhouse at Fremantle. Fifteen-year-old John Gavin had been found guilty of the murder of George Pollard at South Dandalup, despite the circumstantial evidence and an absence of motive.
 
As soon as Fremantle Prison came under local control in 1886, a refractory block with gallows was planned. It was completed in 1888, and first used in 1889 to execute convicted murderer Jimmy Long, a Malay. The gallows room remained a legal place of execution until 1984. 43 men and one woman were hanged in this period. Martha Rendell was the only woman to be hanged at the prison, in 1909. The last person to be hanged was serial killer Eric Edgar Cooke, executed in 1964.

From the day of sentencing to death, prisoners were kept in a concrete-floored cell in New Division. They were vigilantly observed to prevent them escaping their sentence through suicide. With hangings taking place on Monday mornings, at 8:00 am, condemned prisoners were woken three hours earlier, and provided with a last meal, shower, and clean clothes. Afterwards, handcuffed, they were moved to a holding or "condemned cell" nearby the gallows, and allowed a couple of sips of brandy to calm their nerves.

Shortly before 8:00 am, they were hooded, and led up to the execution chamber, which could hold as many as eleven witnesses. They were made to stand over the trap door, had a noose put around their neck, and were hanged by falling through the opening trap door. After medical examination, the deceased was removed for burial.
Witnesses could become distressed during executions, and even officers sometimes fainted. It was also difficult to find someone, usually independent of the prison, to employ as the executioner – they were often recruited from the eastern states in the 20th century.

In the 19th century, the media gave comprehensive accounts of the executions. Harry Pres's final moments on 8 November 1889 were described by The West Australian as:

Initially seen as a way to intimidate the population through the application of the law, executions carried out at Fremantle Prison became private matters, concealed within its walls. Capital punishment was abolished in Western Australia in 1984, and by the 21st century few Australians yearned for it. Author and journalist Cyril Ayris wrote that:

List

See also

 Capital punishment in Australia
 List of people legally executed in Western Australia
 Architecture of Fremantle Prison
 History of Fremantle Prison
 Riots at Fremantle Prison
 Staff and prisoners of Fremantle Prison

References

Further reading
 

Fremantle Prison
Fremantle Prison
Fremantle-related lists
Australian crime-related lists